Colorado offers many world-class ski resorts.  The following table compares their various sizes, runs, lifts, and snowfall:

See also
 Comparison of California ski resorts
 Comparison of New Mexico ski resorts
 Comparison of North American ski resorts
 List of ski areas and resorts in the United States

References

External links 
 Colorado Ski Resorts Comparison

Ski areas and resorts in Colorado
Lists of ski areas and resorts